Concepción (originally: Concepción de la Madre Santísima de la Luz, "Conception of the Blessed Mother of Light") is a city and commune in central Chile, and the geographical and demographic core of the Greater Concepción metropolitan area, one of the three major conurbations in the country. It has a significant impact on domestic trade being part of the most heavily industrialized region in the country. It is the seat of the Concepción Province and the capital of the Bío Bío Region. It sits about 500 km south of the nation's capital, Santiago.

The city was first settled in the Bay of Concepción, in the zone that would later become the commune of Penco, now part of the Concepción conurbation. The city's demonym, comes from the place of its original foundation. The city center and historic district is located in the Valle de la Mocha (La Mocha Valley), where it relocated after serious damages left by an earthquake in 1751.

The origin of Concepción dates back to 1550, when it was founded by Pedro de Valdivia as part of the Spanish Empire, under the name of Concepción de María Purísima del Nuevo Extremo, and was the capital of the Kingdom of Chile between 1565 and 1573, retaining the unofficial position of military capital for the rest of the colonial period. The city was an important site in the struggle for Chile's independence, with the Chilean declaration of Independence being held at Concepción's Plaza de la Independencia. Until the election of Manuel Montt in 1851 as president executive power in independent Chile was dominated by Concepción elites.

The city is a known college town in Chile, as it is home to numerous educational institutions, including the University of Concepción, the University of the Bío Bío, and the Catholic University of the Most Holy Conception. The commune also contains various historical bridges, murals, parks and lakes, as well as important cultural venues such as the Teatro Biobío, the Casa del Arte, the local Natural History Museum, and the Teatro Universidad de Concepción.

History

Concepción was founded by Don Pedro de Valdivia in 1550 north of the Bío Bío River, at the site which is today known as Penco. At that time it was given the name Concepción de María Purísima del Nuevo Extremo (Mary Immaculate Conception of the New End). The new settlement of Concepción was just a few kilometers north of La Frontera (The Frontier), the boundary between Spanish territory and the land of the Mapuche, an American Indian ethnic group that remained independent until the 1870s. The settlement was formally recognized by the Spanish authorities as a town two years later by a royal decree. It was given a coat-of-arms that is still in use today.

At the time of the Spanish arrival to the Concepción area chronicler Jerónimo de Vivar noted local Mapuches wore gold and silver bracelets and "sort of crowns". This is interpreted either as Incan gifts, war spoils from defeated Incas, or the adoption of Incan metallurgy.

Although Concepción was a significant military settlement for the Captaincy General of Chile, it was overrun and destroyed by Mapuche armies in 1554, and once again after being refounded in 1555. Concepción was restored during the governorship of García Hurtado de Mendoza when he landed there and built a fort on the Alto de Pinto in 1557. The town was refounded once more on January 6, 1558, by captain Jerónimo de Villegas. It became the headquarters of the military forces engaged against the Mapuche in La Araucanía over the next two centuries, growing to a population of 10,000 despite a siege in 1564 and other attacks by the Mapuche. Concepción was the home of the Real Audiencia from 1565 to 1575.

Earthquakes and tsunamis, which razed the town in 1570, 1657, 1687, 1730 and 1751, led the authorities to move the town to its current site in the Valle de la Mocha, alongside the Bío Bío River; the old site lay empty until March 29, 1842, when the present town of Penco was founded.

The new site for the town of Concepción became the main town of the Intendancy of Concepción, whose jurisdiction extended from the Maule River to La Frontera. The first Intendant of Concepción was the Irishman Ambrose O'Higgins, Marquis of Osorno, who later became Royal Governor of Chile and Viceroy of Peru.

When the First National Government Board met in Santiago on September 18, 1810, citizens of Concepción joined up. Concepción was used as the point of entry by the Spanish Army in the attempt by the Viceroyalty of Peru to re-conquer Chile. Concepción politicians and soldiers became a significant political force in the newly independent country.

On January 1, 1818, Ambrose O'Higgins's son, Bernardo O'Higgins, proclaimed and took the oath of the Chilean War of Independence in the main square of Concepción, which since then has been known as "Plaza de la Independencia". Until the moment of independence, the city had been the scene of various engagements in its old and new settlements.

On February 20, 1835, the town again was largely destroyed by an earthquake and had to be rebuilt.

By 1875, a key British community and German colony existed within the province.  By 1895, there was an even larger Spanish presence.

The Universidad de Concepción, founded in 1919, became the first secular private university in Chile. The neighboring harbor of Talcahuano is the site of the largest naval base in Chile.

On February 27, 2010, an 8.8 magnitude earthquake struck the city of Concepción, killing more than 521 people and injuring thousands nationwide. The tsunami that followed missed the city.

After the 2010 Chile earthquake, a prison riot began in Concepción's El Manzano prison following a failed escape attempt by the inmates. Different parts of the prison were set on fire and the riot was controlled only after the guards shot into the air and received help from military units. As of March 5, 2010, a Peruvian field hospital has been deployed to the city.

Seismology
Like most of the Chilean territory, the Concepción region is seismically active, with much of Concepción destroyed by a violent earthquake in 1939. An earthquake in 1953 damaged 15% of the town's buildings. Another major earthquake in 1960 had a nearby epicenter.

On February 27, 2010, an earthquake of 8.8 magnitudes struck at 35.846°S, 72.719°W,  NNE of the city. The effects were felt as far away as São Paulo, Brazil—.

Education
Concepción is known as "the university city" thanks to the numerous universities within the urban agglomeration, since one of the most important universities of the country were founded here, such as the Universidad de Concepción, Universidad Católica de la Santísima Concepción and Universidad del Biobío. This city also has numerous headquarters for many other universities. In addition, this metropolis has a large educational offer, focused on institutes, centers of technical formation and the universities aforementioned.

Universities
The University Pencopolitana whose name was Pontificia Universidad Pencopolitana de La Concepción (Pontifical Pencopolitana University of The Conception) was an old university founded through a decree of the Bishop of Concepción, delivered to the administration of the Society of Jesus which functioned between the years 1724 and 1767. On May 24, 1751, an earthquake followed by a tsunami, ravaged the city causing serious damage, including the destruction of the library of the university and all of its funds. As a product of the fury of the waters, a rich collection of texts of the governance of southern Chile were lost, which resulted in a disaster for the culture and collective memory of the city. Due to the natural disasters, it was decided to relocate the city to the called Valle de la Mocha, location where it is currently situated. Slowly the seminary was revived in the new location, in a period of decline in academic activity in Chilean monastic universities after the creation of the Universidad de San Felipe, yet some degrees continued to be granted before the Suppression of the Society of Jesus in 1767.
The aforementioned University is considered to be the natural and legitimate predecessor of the Universidad Católica de la Santísima Concepción (UCSC), erected by the Archbishop of Concepción in 1991, from the Talcahuano Regional Headquarters of the Pontificia Universidad Católica de Chile.

The image of the Pontifical University of Concepción Pencopolitana, is still valid, for His Majesty King Juan Carlos I of Spain in his 1990 speech on the occasion of his inauguration as Doctor Honoris Causa in the University of Chile, in Santiago de Chile, said: "The work of the Pontifical University Pencopolitana should not be ignored, even before the creation of the University of San Felipe" (Juan Carlos's account fails to acknowledge the existence of San Felipe's predecessor, the Dominican Universidad de Santo Tomás de Aquino, from the sixteenth century in Santiago).

Meanwhile, the University of Chile allowed schools in the city to teach courses in law which allowed men to obtain a law degree. Among its students was Henry Urrutia Manzano, who decades later became president of the Supreme Court of Chile.

The Universidad de Concepción was created in 1919 by a group of citizens including Enrique Molina Garmendia, its first rector.

Eventually, the university began to receive state support, becoming part of the traditional universities, becoming one of the three most important universities in the country, and the most important at the regional level.

Traditional universities
 Universidad de Concepción
 Universidad del Bío-Bío
 Universidad Católica de la Santísima Concepción
 Universidad Técnica Federico Santa María

Private universities
 Universidad del Desarrollo
 Universidad Andrés Bello
 Universidad Arcis
 Universidad San Sebastián
 Universidad Santo Tomás
 University of the Pacific (Chile)
 Universidad de Las Américas
 Universidad Bolivariana
 Universidad Pedro de Valdivia
 Universidad La República
 Universidad de Aconcagua
 Universidad Tecnológica de Chile INACAP

Professional institutes
 Instituto Profesional DuocUC, of the Pontificia Universidad Católica de Chile
 Instituto Profesional Virginio Gómez, of the Universidad de Concepción
 Instituto Tecnológico, of the Universidad Católica de la Santísima Concepción
 Instituto Profesional Santo Tomás, of the Universidad Santo Tomás
 Instituto Profesional AIEP, of the Universidad Andrés Bello
 Instituto Profesional La Araucana
 Instituto Profesional Providencia
 Instituto de Estudios Bancarios Guillermo Subercaseaux
 Instituto Profesional Diego Portales
 Instituto Profesional Crecic
 Instituto Profesional Placex
 Instituto Profesional INACAP

Primary and secondary schools

The city has a French international school, the Lycée Français Charles de Gaulle and a German school, the Colegio Alemán de Concepción and a British school, Saint John's School, the former located in the city downtown and the latter examples in San Pedro de la Paz.

The defunct Concepción College was a parochial girls' day school and boarding school, established in 1878 by the Methodist Episcopal Church.

Liceo Comercial Femenino Concepción

Transportation
The city is served by Carriel Sur International Airport in Talcahuano. The metro area's public transportation comprises a number of bus lines that run through several avenues and streets of the communes belonging to the agglomeration, as well as the commuter rail system known as Biotrén.

Climate
The climate of Concepción is classified as Köppen: Csb, warm summer mediterranean , with a dry warm summer in February. The cool waters of the Pacific Ocean help to maintain mild temperatures throughout the year. Temperatures rarely exceed  or fall below . In the six-month period between May and October, the city receives approximately 83% of its total annual precipitation, which totals . The maritime cooling brings much cooler temperatures than nearby inland areas on the same parallel in Argentina, where average summer highs match Concepción's all-time records. Summer temperatures for the 36 degrees latitude are rarely as cool as they are in Concepción, and on the Atlantic coast of Argentina, similar or hotter summer temperatures are found much further from the equator. However, this moderation is evident for the entire Chilean Pacific so is not unique to Concepción. Similar cool-summer mediterranean climate tendencies are found on the West Coast of North America on similar parallels, even though Concepción tends to have slightly wetter winters than San Francisco for example.
Conversely, record winter nighttime temperatures in Concepcion are significantly more moderate than temperatures recorded on the Argentine Atlantic coast at the same latitude, where temperatures below  have occurred.

As might be expected for such a large urban area heavily dependent on wood-burning for heat and diesel for transport, the air in Concepción is third-most polluted in Chile, after Santiago and Temuco.

Demographics

As a commune, Concepcion is home to 14.35% of the total population of the region. 1.88% (4,058 persons) is for the rural population and 98.12% (212,003) for the urban population. Moreover, 5.5% of the country's population lives in the Greater Concepción metro area.

Between 1970 and 1982 there is a large increase in the population. One reason is the inclusion of San Pedro, segregated from the municipality of Coronel.

The Concepción commune population sharply declined in 1996 as its territory was divided, creating Chiguayante and San Pedro de la Paz. The number of people living in these communes has grown quickly since they have become bedroom communities of Concepción, i.e. residential cities that do not have a center with many shops, as is the case of Concepcion.

There is a significant percentage of foreign residents in the city, the most numerous are the Spanish, Italian and US expatriate communities. There are also smaller segments of German, French, British, Dutch, Greek, Portuguese, Croatian, Scandinavian, Arab and Australian descendants in a city settled by waves of immigration.

Cultural life

To an outsider, there may be confusion between the demonyms of the inhabitants of Concepción and the nearby city of Penco. Due to the previous location of Concepción being where Penco currently stands, inhabitants of Concepción are called penquistas while inhabitants of Penco are known as pencones. Additionally, the unofficial term pencopolitano has been coined to refer to locals of any commune belonging to the metropolis or, in a wider definition, to the Concepción province, although the term penquista can technically be used in this case as well.

In 2014, the Rock en Conce festival began to take shape. It would be held outdoors, in the city's Parque Bicentenario (Bicentennial Park), and access to it would be free. The aim of the festival would be to restore the musical spotlight that the city embodied and that earned it the reputation of being the cradle of Chilean rock and, at the same time, to establish itself as a major tourist attraction for the city. Its first edition took place on Saturday, March 7, 2015, and since then it has been held with great success every year at the end of each summer, bringing together emerging local bands with major and renowned artists from the national and international scene.

Music
Concepción has been described as the "Chilean capital of rock", since numerous bands of this genre have started their careers in the city, such as Los Tres, Los Bunkers, Emociones Clandestinas, Santos Dumont, De Saloon, Machuca and Julius Popper, among others. Numerous bands have played their first major concerts in the city, such as Los Prisioneros.

The city's music venues are a main feature of the tourist route, La Ruta de la Música, a project driven by the National Service of Tourism (SERNATUR), where besides the rock scene, the local jazz and folk scenes are also shown.

Sports
Concepción was one of the host cities of the official 1959 Basketball World Cup, where Chile won the bronze medal.

Today, Concepción is home to three professional football teams:
 Club Deportivo Universidad de Concepción, currently in the Primera División
 Club Deportivo Ferroviario Almirante Arturo Fernández Vial, currently, in the Chilean second division
 Club de Deportes Concepción, currently in the Chilean third division.

The most notable professional basketballteam is:
C.D. Universidad de Concepción, currently in the Liga Nacional de Básquetbol de Chile.

Economy

Historically characterized by a strong manufacturing industry, Concepción has also been a major center for distribution and services and the financial basis of the regional economy.

Commerce
Trade in the city is concentrated in the Plaza Independencia (Independence Square), the pedestrian street Alonso de Ercilla y Zúñiga (built in 1981), and along the major avenues. One such avenue is the Diego Barros Arana  street which has developed into the commercial center of the city and the region was until 1907 even known as "calle Comercio" ("Commerce Street"). New commercial centers are being developed around the old central station and the new civic district as a part of the Chilean bicentennial (September 18, 2010). A considerable percentage of local trade is taking place in settlements around the city, in communes such as Hualpén, Talcahuano and San Pedro de la Paz, where there are bustling shopping centers, such as Mall Plaza del Trébol, and where there is a constant commercial development.

Other commercial spots, related to food, are the Vega Monumental and Mercado Central de Concepción (Central Market of Concepción) places offering various services and agricultural and livestock products.

Administration
As a commune, Concepción is a third-level administrative division of Chile administered by a municipal council, headed by an alcalde who is directly elected every four years. The 2016–2020 mayor is Alvaro Ortiz Vera (Christian Democratic Party), who was first elected in 2012. The communal council has 10 seats, which are currently occupied (2016–2020) by three for Christian Democratic Party, two for National Renewal, two for Independent Democrat Union, one for Communist Party, one for Socialist Party, and one for Radical Party. The following members are:

Within the electoral divisions of Chile, Concepción is represented in the Chamber of Deputies by Gaston Saavedra (PS), José Miguel Ortiz (PDC), Jaime Toha (PS), Felix Gonzalez (PEV), Enrique Van Rysselberghe (UDI), Sergio Bobadilla (UDI), Francesca Muñoz (RN) and Leonidas Romero (RN), as part of the 21st electoral district (Concepción Province without Lota). The commune is represented in the Senate by Alejandro Navarro Brain (MAS) and Jacqueline Van Rysselberghe (UDI) as part of the 12th senatorial constituency (Biobío-Costa).

Notable citizens

Gallery

Notable events
A 23 year old Chilean forestry student named Jorge Matute disappeared mysteriously in a discotheque that was located close to Concepción on 20 November 1999. In February 2004 in a road in Santa Juana Matute's remains were found and identified.

Twin towns – sister cities
Concepción's sister cities are:

 Bethlehem, Palestine (2006)
 Campinas, Brasil (1979)
 Cascavel, Brazil (2006)
 Guayaquil, Ecuador (2006)
 Medellín, Colombia (1998)
 Monterrey, Mexico (1997)
 Nanjing, China (2018)
 La Plata, Argentina (1993)
 San Miguel de Tucumán, Argentina (2013)
 Wuhan, China (2014)

See also
 Greater Concepción
 Biobío Region
 Santa Juana
 Florida
 Dichato
 Biobío River

References
 Ida Stevenson Weldon Vernon (1969) Pedro de Valdivia, Conquistador of Chile, Greenwood Press
 John Milton Nickles, Marie Siegrist (1965) Bibliography and Index of Geology Exclusive of North America, Geological Society of America, v.28

Line notes

Citations

External links

El Sur El Sur, newspaper of Concepción 
Viveconce, Event schedule of Concepción 
 Source about Concepción – Encyclopædia Britannica
 Geographical coordinates and NASA images, Google 

 
Communes of Chile
Capitals of Chilean regions
Capitals of Chilean provinces
Populated places established in 1550
Geography of Biobío Region
Populated places in Concepción Province
1550 establishments in the Spanish Empire
1550 establishments in South America